The Palais des Congrès de Lyon (or "Cité des Congrès de Lyon" or "Centre de Congrès de Lyon") is a convention hall which is part of the Cité Internationale, a newly built district of Lyon, France.

Overview 

The building was designed by architect Renzo Piano and is located in the 6th arrondissement of Lyon. It was inaugurated in early June 2006.

It includes an amphitheater commonly named "Salle 3000" with a capacity of 900–3,220 places (hence its name), 2 auditoriums "Lumière" (900 places) and "Pasteur" (300 places), an exhibition area of 8,400 m2, 26 halls of 50-450 places and 3 reception halls of 300, 800, and 1860 m2.

In its first six months, the Palais des Congrès de Lyon hosted 120,000 spectators in 12 shows and 30,000-40,000 conventioneers in 11 conventions. It enabled Lyon to be among the major European cities to host major international conferences.

Cité internationale of Lyon  
In addition to the Palais des Congrès de Lyon, the "Cité internationale" includes an underground public parking of 1,200 places, an exhibition area of 5,400 m2, ten new rooms of commissions of 1,500 m2, a residential hotel, two 4-star hotels, several restaurants, a center and a 4000-m2 tertiary public square.

References

External links
 Official site
 Set of photos

6th arrondissement of Lyon
Buildings and structures in Lyon
Renzo Piano buildings
Tourist attractions in Lyon